Sebastian (alternative title När alla vet) is a 1995 Swedish film based on the novel by Per Knutsen that chronicles the coming out experience of a teenage boy. It is directed by Svend Wam.

Plot
16-year-old Sebastian (Hampus Björck) has nice parents and a great circle of friends, is doing well in school, has good looks, and leads a happy life—or at least that is what everyone thinks. Secretly, he has been brooding for some time over the fact that he is in love with his best friend, the rather hunky Ulf (Nicolai Cleve Broch).

One evening, after some playful frolicking around with Ulf, Sebastian plants a kiss on Ulf's lips, not exactly to the latter's delight. Being sexually rejected in this way throws Sebastian into an even deeper depression about his sexuality. He refuses to discuss these issues with his parents and only after a long talk with a female friend of his, who is also in love with Ulf and guesses correctly what Sebastian's problem could be, he opens up to his family and friends, only to find that it is not all that problematic to them.

Even the coming out to Ulf, which he anticipated to be very painful, turns out to be not so bad and actually takes a comical turn when Ulf admits to having had a homosexual experience himself some time ago. In the end, basically nothing has changed, except that Sebastian no longer has to waste energy guarding his secret and can instead concentrate on being happy, having fun with his friends, and perhaps finding a real boyfriend someday.

Cast
 Hampus Björck as Sebastian
 Nicolai Cleve Broch as Ulf
 Ewa Fröling as Mother
 Helge Jordal as Father
 Rebecka Hemse as Lisbeth
 Lena Olander as Linda
 Emil Lindroth as Jan
 Karin Hagås as Inga
 Mira Mandoki as Lisa
 Stig Torstensson as Fyllie
 Sara Alström as Girl #1
 Johanna Sällström as Girl #2
 Bård Torgersen as Vendor

Reactions
In critical reviews, Sebastian is frequently dismissed as escapist gay youth fare that does not address any deeper issues. However, as the movie points out correctly, the most difficult part of the coming out process is fighting one's inner uncertainty and self-doubt. And even if (as in the case of Sebastian) a coming out is comparatively eventless, the inner resolve required to take that step stays the same.

External links

1995 films
Films directed by Svend Wam
Swedish LGBT-related films
LGBT-related drama films
LGBT-related coming-of-age films
1995 LGBT-related films
1995 drama films
1990s Swedish films